The olive bulbul (Iole viridescens) is a species of songbird in the bulbul family, Pycnonotidae.
It is found from southern Myanmar to south-western Thailand and the Malay Peninsula.
Its natural habitats are subtropical or tropical moist lowland forests and subtropical or tropical moist montane forests.

Taxonomy and systematics
Formerly, the olive bulbul was classified in the genera Microscelis and Hypsipetes by some authorities. The synonym Hypsipetes virescens has also been used for the Nicobar bulbul and the Sunda bulbul. Alternative names for the olive bulbul include Blyth's olive bulbul, Sumatran bulbul, and viridescent bulbul. The name 'olive bulbul' is also used as an alternative name by the yellow-bearded greenbul and the sulphur-bellied bulbul.

Subspecies
Three subspecies are currently recognized. The Cachar bulbul was also considered as a subspecies of the olive bulbul until it was split off and re-classified as a separate species by the IOC in 2017:

 I. v. viridescens - Blyth, 1867: Found in southern Myanmar and south-western Thailand
 I. v. lekhakuni - (Deignan, 1954):  Found in southern Myanmar and south-western Thailand
 I. v. cinnamomeoventris - Baker, ECS, 1917: Found on northern and central Malay Peninsula

References

olive bulbul
Birds of Bangladesh
Birds of Myanmar
olive bulbul
olive bulbul
Taxonomy articles created by Polbot